Vibrissae (singular: vibrissa), more generally called whiskers, are a type of stiff, functional hair used by mammals to sense their environment. These hairs are finely specialised for this purpose, whereas other types of hair are coarser as tactile sensors. Although whiskers are specifically those found around the face, vibrissae are known to grow in clusters at various places around the body. Most mammals have them, including all non-human primates and especially nocturnal mammals.

Whiskers are sensitive tactile hairs that aid navigation, locomotion, exploration, hunting, social touch and perform other functions. 

This article is primarily about the specialised sensing hairs of mammals, but some birds, fish, insects, crustaceans and other arthropods are known to have similar structures also used to sense the environment.

Etymology
Vibrissae (from Latin  'to vibrate') from the characteristic motion seen in a small rodent that is otherwise sitting still.
In medicine, the term also refers to the thick hairs found inside human nostrils.

Evolution
The last universal common ancestor of all extant mammals had vibrissae. Great apes are the only extant mammal species which do not have vibrissae. All extant mammal species retain the ancestral layout of the whiskers along with the special facial muscles that move them.

Anatomy 
Vibrissae are anatomically distinguished from other hair. They are easily visually identified since they are longer, stiffer, significantly larger in diameter, and stand above the surrounding fur by a considerable amount. In addition they have well-innervated follicles, and an identifiable representation in the somatosensory cortex of the brain.  The largest number and the longest are found among the small, social, arboreal, and nocturnal mammals. Whiskers of aquatic mammals the most sensitive. During foraging in complex, dark habitats, whiskers are rapidly moved in a cyclic way, tracing small circles at their tips. This motion, called "whisking" can occur at speeds of 25 Hz in mice, which is one of the fastest movements that mammals can make. It is clear that these animals use whisking to position their front paws during locomotion.

Vibrissal groups 

Vibrissae typically grow in clusters. These groups vary somewhat in form and function, but they are relatively consistent among land mammals. Between land and marine mammals, there is less consistency (though commonalities are certainly present).

Many land mammals, like rats and hamsters, have four typical whisker groups on their heads (called cranial vibrissae), which might vary among animals due to different lifestyles. These cranial groups include:
 above the eyes (supraorbital)
 on the cheeks (genal)
 where a moustache would be (mystacial)
 under the snout (mandibular).

The mystacial whiskers can be roughly identified as macrovibrissae (long whiskers for feeling the space around the head) and microvibrissae (small, down-pointing whiskers for identifying objects). Not only are these two types hard to distinguish on an animal's face (see for example the image of a rat here), there are similarly weak distinctions in how they are used, though the distinction is nonetheless referred to ubiquitously in scientific literature and is considered useful in analysis.

Many land mammals, including domestic cats, also have vibrissae on the underside of the leg just above the paws (called carpal vibrissae). Whilst these five major groups are often reported in studies of land mammals, several other groups have been reported more occasionally; for instance nasal, angular, and submental whiskers.

Marine mammals can have substantially different arrangements of their vibrissae. For instance, whales and dolphins have lost their snout whiskers and gained vibrissae around their blowholes, whereas every single one of the body hairs of the Florida manatee may be a vibrissa (see image). Other marine mammals, like seals and sea-lions, have head vibrissae just like those on land mammals (see image), although these groups function quite differently.

Vibrissal follicles have evolved other functions in dolphins, such as electroreception.

Vibrissae 
The vibrissal hair is usually thicker and stiffer than other types of (pelagic) hair but, like other hairs, the shaft consists of an inert material (keratin) and contains no nerves. However, vibrissae are different from other hair structures because they grow from a special hair follicle incorporating a capsule of blood called a blood sinus which is heavily innervated by sensory nerves. Vibrissae are symmetrically arranged in groups on the face and supply the trigeminal nerve.

The mystacial macrovibrissae are shared by a large group of land and marine mammals (see images), and it is this group that has received by far the most scientific study. The arrangement of these whiskers is not random: they form an ordered grid of arcs (columns) and rows, with shorter whiskers at the front and longer whiskers at the rear (see images). In the mouse, gerbil, hamster, rat, guinea pig, rabbit, and cat, each individual follicle is innervated by 100–200 primary afferent nerve cells. These cells serve an even larger number of mechanoreceptors of at least eight distinct types. Accordingly, even small deflections of the vibrissal hair can evoke a sensory response in the animal. Rats and mice typically have approximately 30 macrovibrissae on each side of the face, with whisker lengths up to around 50 mm in (laboratory) rats, 30 mm in (laboratory) mice, and a slightly larger number of microvibrissae. Thus, an estimate for the total number of sensory nerve cells serving the mystacial vibrissal array on the face of a rat or mouse might be 25,000. Natural shapes of rat's mystacial pad vibrissae are well approximated by pieces of the Euler spiral. When all these pieces for a single rat are assembled together, they span an interval extending from one coiled domain of the Euler spiral to the other.

Rats and mice are considered to be "whisker specialists", but marine mammals may make even greater investment in their vibrissal sensory system. Seal whiskers, which are similarly arrayed across the mystacial region, are each served by around 10 times as many nerve fibres as those in rats and mice, so that the total number of nerve cells innervating the mystacial vibrissae of a seal has been estimated to be in excess of 300,000. Manatees, remarkably, have around 600 vibrissae on or around their lips.

Whiskers can be very long in some species; the length of a chinchilla's whiskers can be more than a third of its body length (see image). Even in species with shorter whiskers, they can be very prominent appendages (see images). Thus, whilst whiskers certainly could be described as "proximal sensors" in contrast to, say, eyes, they offer a tactile sense with a sensing range that is functionally very significant.

Operation

Movement 

The follicles of some groups of vibrissae in some species are motile. Generally, the supraorbital, genal and macrovibrissae are motile, whereas the microvibrissae are not. This is reflected in anatomical reports that have identified musculature associated with the macrovibrissae that is absent for the microvibrissae. A small muscle 'sling' is attached to each macrovibrissa and can move it more-or-less independently of the others, whilst larger muscles in the surrounding tissue move many or all of the macrovibrissae together.

Amongst those species with motile macrovibrissae, some (rats, mice, flying squirrels, gerbils, chinchillas, hamsters, shrews, porcupines, opossums) move them back and forth periodically in a movement known as whisking, while other species (cats, dogs, raccoons, pandas) do not appear to. The distribution of mechanoreceptor types in the whisker follicle differs between rats and cats, which may correspond to this difference in the way they are used. Whisking movements are amongst the fastest produced by mammals. In all whisking animals in which it has so far been measured, these whisking movements are rapidly controlled in response to behavioural and environmental conditions. The whisking movements occur in bouts of variable duration, and at rates between 3 and 25 whisks/second. Movements of the whiskers are closely co-ordinated with those of the head and body.

Function 
Generally, vibrissae are considered to mediate a tactile sense, complementary to that of skin. This is presumed to be advantageous in particular to animals that cannot always rely on sight to navigate or to find food, for example, nocturnal animals or animals which forage in muddy waters. Sensory function aside, movements of the vibrissae may also indicate something of the state of mind of the animal, and the whiskers play a role in social behaviour of rats.

The sensory function of vibrissae is an active research area—experiments to establish the capabilities of whiskers use a variety of techniques, including temporary deprivation either of the whisker sense or of other senses. Animals can be deprived of their whisker sense for a period of weeks by whisker trimming (they soon grow back), or for the duration of an experimental trial by restraining the whiskers with a flexible cover like a mask (the latter technique is used, in particular, in studies of marine mammals). Such experiments have shown that whiskers are required for, or contribute to: object localization, orienting of the snout, detection of movement, texture discrimination, shape discrimination, exploration, thigmotaxis, locomotion, maintenance of equilibrium, maze learning, swimming, locating food pellets, locating food animals, and fighting, as well as nipple attachment and huddling in rat pups.

Whisking—the periodic movement of the whiskers—is also presumed to serve tactile sensing in some way. However, exactly why an animal might be driven "to beat the night with sticks", as one researcher once put it, is a matter of debate, and the answer is probably multi-faceted. Scholarpedia offers:

Animals that do not whisk, but have motile whiskers, presumably also gain some advantage from the investment in musculature. Dorothy Souza, in her book Look What Whiskers Can Do reports some whisker movement during prey capture (in cats, in this case):

Anecdotally, it is often stated that cats use their whiskers to gauge whether an opening is wide enough for their body to pass through. This is sometimes supported by the statement that the whiskers of individual cats extend out to about the same width as the cat's body, but at least two informal reports indicate that whisker length is genetically determined and does not vary as the cat grows thinner or fatter. In the laboratory, rats are able to accurately (within 5–10%) discriminate the size of an opening, so it seems likely that cats can use their whiskers for this purpose. However, reports of cats, particularly kittens, with their heads firmly stuck in some discarded receptacle are commonplace indicating that if a cat has this information available, it does not always make best use of it.

Marine mammals
Pinnipeds have well-developed tactile senses. Their mystacial vibrissae have ten times the innervation of terrestrial mammals, allowing them to effectively detect vibrations in the water. These vibrations are generated, for example, when a fish swims through water. Detecting vibrations is useful when the animals are foraging and may add to or even replace vision, particularly in darkness.

Harbor seals have been observed following varying paths of other organisms that swam ahead several minutes before, similar to a dog following a scent trail, and even to discriminate the species and the size of the fish responsible for the trail.  Blind ringed seals have even been observed successfully hunting on their own in Lake Saimaa, likely relying on their vibrissae to gain sensory information and catch prey. Unlike terrestrial mammals, such as rodents, pinnipeds do not move their vibrissae over an object when examining it but instead extend their moveable whiskers and keep them in the same position. By holding their vibrissae steady, pinnipeds are able to maximize their detection ability. The vibrissae of seals are undulated and wavy while sea lion and walrus vibrissae are smooth. Research is ongoing to determine the function, if any, of these shapes on detection ability. The vibrissa's angle relative to the flow, and not the fiber shape, however, seems to be the most important factor.

Most cetaceans have whiskers at birth but they are typically lost during maturation. The follicles and any vestigial hair sometimes function as touch or electrical sense organs.

Lines of research

Neuroscience 
A large part of the brain of whisker-specialist mammals is involved in the processing of nerve impulses from vibrissae, a fact that presumably corresponds to the important position the sense occupies for the animal. Information from the vibrissae arrives in the brain via the trigeminal nerve and is delivered first into the trigeminal sensory complex of brainstem. From there, the most studied pathways are those leading up through parts of thalamus and into barrel cortex, though other major pathways through the superior colliculus in midbrain (a major visual structure in visual animals) and the cerebellum, to name but a couple, are increasingly coming under scrutiny. Neuroscientists, and other researchers, studying sensory systems favour the whisker system for a number of reasons (see Barrel cortex), not least the simple fact that laboratory rats and mice are whisker, rather than visual, specialists.

Evolutionary biology 
The presence of mystacial vibrissae in distinct lineages (Rodentia, Afrotheria, marsupials) with remarkable conservation of operation suggests that they may be an old feature present in a common ancestor of all therian mammals. Indeed, some humans even still develop vestigial vibrissal muscles in the upper lip, consistent with the hypothesis that previous members of the human lineage had mystacial vibrissae. Thus, it is possible that the development of the whisker sensory system played an important role in mammalian development, more generally.

Artificial whiskers 
Researchers have begun to build artificial whiskers of a variety of types, both to help them understand how biological whiskers work and as a tactile sense for robots. These efforts range from the abstract, through feature-specific models, to attempts to reproduce complete whiskered animals in robot form (ScratchBot and ShrewBot,  both robots by Bristol Robotics Laboratory).

In non-mammalian animals

A range of non-mammalian animals possess structures which resemble or function similarly to mammalian whiskers.

In birds

Some birds possess specialized hair-like feathers called rictal bristles around the base of the beak which are sometimes referred to as whiskers.
 
The whiskered auklet (Aethia pygmaea) has striking, stiff white feathers protruding from above and below the eyes of the otherwise slate-grey bird, and a dark plume which swoops forward from the top of its head. Whiskered auklets sent through a maze of tunnels with their feathers taped back bumped their heads more than twice as often as they did when their feathers were free, indicating they use their feathers in a similar way to cats.

Other birds that have obvious "whiskers" are kiwis, flycatchers, swallows, nightjars, whip-poor-wills, the kakapo and the long-whiskered owlet (Xenoglaux loweryi).

In fish

Some fish have slender, pendulous tactile organs near the mouth.  These are often referred to as "whiskers", although they are more correctly termed barbels. Fish that have barbels include the catfish, carp, goatfish, hagfish, sturgeon, zebrafish and some species of shark.

The Pimelodidae are a family of catfishes (order Siluriformes) commonly known as the long-whiskered catfishes.

In pterosaurs

Anurognathid pterosaurs had a rugose (wrinkled) jaw texture that has been interpreted as the attachment sites for vibrissae, though actual vibrissae have not been recorded. More recently, a specific type of feathers, has been found around anurognathid mouths.

Gallery

References

External links 
 A night in the life of a rat, Annals of the New York Academy of Sciences, 1225:110–118, April 2011.
 The Mysterious Whiskers of Cats, Blog-post about the functions of cat whiskers, April 7, 2012.

Mammal anatomy
Animal hair